Castello di Gagliano Aterno (Italian for Castle of Gagliano Aterno)  is a  Middle Ages castle in Gagliano Aterno, Province of L'Aquila (Abruzzo).

History

Architecture

References

External links

Gagliano Aterno
Gagliano Aterno